The following television stations operate on virtual channel 21 in the United States:

The following stations, which are no longer licensed, formerly operated on virtual channel 21:
 K19LX-D in Granite Falls, Minnesota
 K21KD-D in Wyola, Montana
 K21MC-D in Hobbs, New Mexico
 K21PC-D in Geronimo, Oklahoma
 K23LK-D in Modesto, California
 K28LN-D in Orr, Minnesota
 K31KI-D in Round Mountain, Nevada
 KDUG-LD in Hemet, California
 KMIK-LD in Cedar Falls, Iowa
 W21DA-D in Dublin, Georgia
 W21DD-D in Naguabo, Puerto Rico
 WWEA-LD in Wausau, Wisconsin

References

21 virtual